Norbergite is a nesosilicate mineral with formula Mg3(SiO4)(F,OH)2. It is a member of the humite group. 

It was first described in 1926 for an occurrence in the Östanmoss iron mine in Norberg, Västmanland, Sweden, for which it is named.
It occurs in contact metamorphic zones in carbonate rocks intruded by plutonic rocks or pegmatites supplying the fluorine. Associated minerals include dolomite, calcite, tremolite, grossular, wollastonite, forsterite, monticellite, cuspidine, fluoborite, ludwigite, fluorite and phlogopite.

References

Humite group
Magnesium minerals
Orthorhombic minerals
Minerals in space group 62